Landegode Church is a parish church of the Church of Norway in Bodø Municipality in Nordland county, Norway. It is located in the village of Fenes on the island of Landegode. It is one of the churches for the Bodin parish which is part of the Bodø domprosti (deanery) in the Diocese of Sør-Hålogaland. The white, wooden church was built in a long church style in 1920. It was built as a bedehus chapel in 1920 and in January 1997, it was consecrated by Øystein Ingar Larsen as an official church of the Church of Norway.

See also
List of churches in Sør-Hålogaland

References

Churches in Bodø
Churches in Nordland
Wooden churches in Norway
20th-century Church of Norway church buildings
Churches completed in 1920
1920 establishments in Norway
Long churches in Norway